Myaung Township  is a township in Sagaing District in the Sagaing Division of Burma.

External links
Maplandia World Gazetteer - map showing the township boundary

Townships of Sagaing Region